Christine M. Jones (December 25, 1929 – January 26, 2013) was an American politician who represented district 26 in the Maryland House of Delegates.

Background
Jones was born in Navasota, Texas, on Christmas Day in 1929.  She attended Huston-Tillotson College where she received a B.A. in 1949. Jones was an educator and teacher in the Prince George's County school system for more than 20 years. She was a member of the Oxon Hill Democratic Club, the John Hanson Women's Club, the Southern Prince George's Business and Professional Women's Club, the Prince George's County Education Association and the Maryland State Teachers Association. Jones was also a member of the National Education Association and the Phi Delta Kappa chapter of the Delta Sigma Theta sorority. She served as a board member of the National Conference of Christians and Jews; PG Mental Health Association; Southern Christian Leadership Conference; Center for Community Development. Founder, honorary member, PG Coalition on Black Affairs. She was a member of the Bethlehem Baptist Church Women's Club.

Jones died on January 26, 2013, a week after being rescued from a house fire.

In the legislature
Jones was a member of the House of Delegates (Prince George's County) from 1982 to 1994. She was the Assistant majority floor leader in 1994 and a member of the Economic Matters Committee during her entire tenure. She also served on that committee's Worker's Compensation Subcommittee and the Joint Committee on Administrative, Executive and Legislative Review, the Joint Committee on Federal Relations and the Joint Committee on Protocol. Jones chaired the Legislative Black Caucus of Maryland from 1991 to 1992.

References 

Members of the Maryland House of Delegates
1929 births
2013 deaths
Tennessee State University alumni
Women state legislators in Maryland
People from Navasota, Texas
People from Temple Hills, Maryland
21st-century American women